Suser videre is the eleventh studio album by Norwegian rock band deLillos. Since they re-united the original line-up from 1985, they released this album as deLillos'85.

Track listing
"Jeg plager ingen"
"Hjertespesialist"
"Evig forelsket da"
"Regn"
"Jørgensen"
"Et annet sted"
"Pingvinfilmen"
"Ny paraply"
"Rolig mann"
"Lille verdenskrig tre"
"Du er min supermodell"
"Gå hjem"
"Du var den vi glemte"

2005 albums
DeLillos albums
Sonet Records albums